Turtle Lake Township is a township in Cass County, Minnesota, United States. The population was 699 as of the 2000 census. This township took its name from Turtle Lake.

Geography
According to the United States Census Bureau, the township has a total area of 72.0 square miles (186.5 km), of which 48.7 square miles (126.1 km) is land and 23.3 square miles (60.4 km) (32.39%) is water.

Unincorporated communities
 Baker

Major highways
  Minnesota State Highway 200
  Minnesota State Highway 371

Lakes
 Bag Lake
 Big Hanson Lake
 Blue Bill Lake
 Conklin Lake
 Cub Lake
 Deep Lake
 Diamond Lake
 Gould Lake (southeast quarter)
 Hanson Lakes
 Hovde Lake
 Ivins Lake
 Jack Lake
 Leech Lake (southwest quarter)
 Little Turtle Lake
 Little Webb Lake (north edge)
 Lake 418
 Long Lake
 Nomad Lake
 Rice Lake
 Shell Lake
 Spring Lake
 Spruce Lake
 Tanglewood Lake
 Ten Mile Lake (northeast edge)
 Tepee Lake (northwest half)
 Turtle Lake
 Wabegon Lake

Adjacent townships
 Pine Lake Township (east)
 Birch Lake Township (south)
 Hiram Township (southwest)
 Shingobee Township (west)
 Leech Lake Township (northwest)

Cemeteries
The township contains these three cemeteries: Hope, Medicine Rite and Saint Agnes.

Demographics
As of the census of 2000, there were 699 people, 271 households, and 211 families residing in the township.  The population density was 14.4 people per square mile (5.5/km).  There were 610 housing units at an average density of 12.5/sq mi (4.8/km).  The racial makeup of the township was 65.09% White, 0.29% African American, 30.47% Native American, 0.43% Asian, 0.29% from other races, and 3.43% from two or more races. Hispanic or Latino of any race were 1.29% of the population.

There were 271 households, out of which 29.5% had children under the age of 18 living with them, 59.4% were married couples living together, 12.9% had a female householder with no husband present, and 22.1% were non-families. 15.5% of all households were made up of individuals, and 9.2% had someone living alone who was 65 years of age or older.  The average household size was 2.58 and the average family size was 2.83.

In the township the population was spread out, with 26.6% under the age of 18, 5.7% from 18 to 24, 22.7% from 25 to 44, 27.9% from 45 to 64, and 17.0% who were 65 years of age or older.  The median age was 41 years. For every 100 females, there were 106.8 males.  For every 100 females age 18 and over, there were 98.8 males.

The median income for a household in the township was $38,750, and the median income for a family was $39,219. Males had a median income of $27,404 versus $26,250 for females. The per capita income for the township was $17,049.  About 4.5% of families and 8.2% of the population were below the poverty line, including 9.7% of those under age 18 and 6.4% of those age 65 or over.

References
 United States National Atlas
 United States Census Bureau 2007 TIGER/Line Shapefiles
 United States Board on Geographic Names (GNIS)

Townships in Cass County, Minnesota
Brainerd, Minnesota micropolitan area
Townships in Minnesota